Kim Soo-yun (born 30 August 1989) is a South Korean footballer for Suwon UDC and the South Korean national team. She participated at the 2015 FIFA Women's World Cup.

References

External links

1989 births
Living people
South Korean women's footballers
South Korea women's international footballers
2015 FIFA Women's World Cup players
WK League players
Suwon FC Women players
Women's association football defenders
Asian Games medalists in football
Footballers at the 2010 Asian Games
Asian Games bronze medalists for South Korea
Medalists at the 2010 Asian Games
Universiade gold medalists for South Korea
Universiade medalists in football
Medalists at the 2009 Summer Universiade
21st-century South Korean women